Saint Cronan may refer to:

Mo Chua of Balla, also known as Crónán mac Bécáin, a 7th-century Roman Catholic Saint from western Ireland
Crónán of Roscrea, a 7th-century Roman Catholic Saint known for his work in Roscrea, County Tipperary, Ireland